The 1943 Sugar Bowl featured the fourth ranked Tulsa, and the seventh ranked Tennessee.

Tulsa took a 7–0 lead on a nine-yard touchdown pass from Glenn Dobbs to Cal Purdin in the second quarter. Tennessee scored on a three-yard run by Gold, but the extra point missed leaving the score 7–6. In the third quarter, Tennessee blocked a Tulsa punt out of the end zone for a safety, giving them an 8–7 advantage. And in the fourth quarter, a one-yard Clyde "IG" Fuson run made the final score 14–7.

References

Sugar Bowl
Sugar Bowl
Tennessee Volunteers football bowl games
Tulsa Golden Hurricane football bowl games
Sugar Bowl
Sugar Bowl